Eato is a surname. Notable people with the surname include:

 Alwyn Eato (1929–2008), English cricket player
 Mary E. Eato (1844–1915), African-American suffragist and teacher

See also
 Eaton (surname)
 Eto
 Itō (name)